State Highway 29 Bridge at the Colorado River is located in both   Burnet and Llano counties in the U.S. state of Texas, between Buchanan Dam and Inks Lake . It is also known as Inks Lake Bridge, and was added to the National Register of Historic Places listings in both counties on October 10, 1996. The  1,379.0 ft truss bridge was planned by the Texas Highway Department in 1929. Construction was completed by the Austin Bridge Company in 1937 at a cost of $188,000.  United States Secretary of the Interior Harold Ickes  and Texas Highway Commissioner Robert Lee Bobbitt were featured speakers during the dedication ceremony. A new four-lane vehicular bridge was built in 2005,  and the old SH 29 Bridge is currently open only to pedestrians.

See also

Inks Lake
National Register of Historic Places listings in Burnet County, Texas  
National Register of Historic Places listings in Llano County, Texas
List of bridges on the National Register of Historic Places in Texas

References

Bridges completed in 1937
Road bridges on the National Register of Historic Places in Texas
Buildings and structures in Llano County, Texas
Buildings and structures in Mason County, Texas
Transportation in Llano County, Texas
Transportation in Mason County, Texas
Truss bridges in the United States
National Register of Historic Places in Mason County, Texas
National Register of Historic Places in Llano County, Texas